Szandra Szombathelyi (born ) is a Hungarian female volleyball player, playing as an outside-spiker. She is part of the Hungary women's national volleyball team.

She competed at the 2015 Women's European Volleyball Championship. On club level she plays for Vasas SC Budapest.

References

External links

1989 births
Living people
Place of birth missing (living people)
Hungarian women's volleyball players